East Peru is a city in Madison County, Iowa, United States. The population was 115 at the time of the 2020 census. It is part of the Des Moines–West Des Moines Metropolitan Statistical Area.

History
East Peru had its start in the year 1887 by the building of the railroad through that territory.

Geography
East Peru is located at  (41.227089, -93.925172).

East Peru is the birthplace of the Red Delicious cultivar of apple.

Demographics

2010 census
As of the census of 2010, there were 125 people, 47 households, and 38 families residing in the city. The racial makeup of the city was 100.0% White.

There were 47 households, of which 29.8% had children under the age of 18 living with them, 66.0% were married couples living together, 12.8% had a female householder with no husband present, 2.1% had a male householder with no wife present, and 19.1% were non-families. 12.8% of all households were made up of individuals, and 4.3% had someone living alone who was 65 years of age or older. The average household size was 2.66 and the average family size was 2.92.

The median age in the city was 45.5 years. 27.2% of residents were under the age of 18; 1.6% were between the ages of 18 and 24; 20.8% were from 25 to 44; 32% were from 45 to 64; and 18.4% were 65 years of age or older. The gender makeup of the city was 50.4% male and 49.6% female.

2000 census
As of the census of 2000, there were 153 people, 53 households, and 46 families residing in the city. The racial makeup of the city was 95.42% White, 0.65% Native American, and 3.92% from two or more races. Hispanic or Latino of any race were 3.92% of the population.

There were 53 households, out of which 35.8% had children under the age of 18 living with them, 75.5% were married couples living together, 7.5% had a female householder with no husband present, and 13.2% were non-families. 11.3% of all households were made up of individuals, and 3.8% had someone living alone who was 65 years of age or older. The average household size was 2.89 and the average family size was 3.09.

In the city, the population was spread out, with 30.1% under the age of 18, 5.9% from 18 to 24, 26.8% from 25 to 44, 24.2% from 45 to 64, and 13.1% who were 65 years of age or older. The median age was 34 years. For every 100 females, there were 112.5 males. For every 100 females age 18 and over, there were 109.8 males.

The median income for a household in the city was $32,083, and the median income for a family was $32,083. Males had a median income of $35,000 versus $20,750 for females. The per capita income for the city was $14,756. About 13.3% of families and 19.1% of the population were below the poverty line, including 37.5% of those under the age of eighteen and 10.0% of those 65 or over.

Government
East Peru is administered by a mayor and council.  The mayor is Chris Jordan.

Education
The Winterset Community School District operates local public schools.

Notable residents

 Mark Pearson (1957-2012), agricultural journalist and television personality, resident of East Peru from 1995 until his death

Notes

References

Cities in Iowa
Cities in Madison County, Iowa
Des Moines metropolitan area
1887 establishments in Iowa